The Al-Hidaya Mosque massacre occurred on April 19, 2008, when Ethiopian soldiers reportedly killed 21 people in Mogadishu, Somalia.

According to several witnesses, Ethiopian soldiers stormed a mosque and killed several occupants. 11 bodies were later found, some with their throat slit and others shot to death. Of the 11 dead victims, nine were regular congregants at the mosque and reportedly were part of the Tabliiq wing of Sunni Islam.

Tabliiq official Shiekh Abdi-kheyr Isse said the Ethiopians had "slaughtered" the clerics. "The first person they [Ethiopian soldiers] killed was Sheikh Said Yahya, the Imam," a witness said, adding that the late Imam opened the mosque door after the soldiers knocked.

See also
Awdiinle massacre

References

External links 
Deadly Somalia mosque raid deplored

Somalia War (2006–2009)
Massacres in religious buildings and structures
Massacres in Somalia
Massacres in 2008
April 2008 events in Africa
Attacks on mosques in Africa
2008 murders in Somalia
April 2008 crimes
Massacres of Muslims
2000s in Mogadishu